A Wireless game adapter is a device that, once connected to a video game console or handheld, enables internet and\or multiplayer access.

Consoles

Xbox 360 

The Wireless Network Adapter for the Xbox 360 is a device that is plugged into the system's rear USB port, allowing for access to the internet via a wireless router.

Wii 

While the Wii has built-in wireless capabilities, it is not compatible with every wireless router. For this reason Nintendo released the Nintendo Wi-Fi USB Connector peripheral that a Wii can connect wirelessly to via an internet enabled computer, wireless or otherwise.

Handhelds

Game Boy Color 
The Mobile GB Adaptor was a Japan-only device that attached to the EXT port on a Game Boy Color. The other end was connected to a cell phone, allowing for access to the internet. It was primarily used for trading and battling on Pokémon Crystal.

Game Boy Advance 

The Game Boy Advance and its two redesigns, the Game Boy Advance SP and the Game Boy Micro all had wireless adapters that were meant to replace the link cable used for local multiplayer. It is not compatible with any game released prior to the adapter's release, and afterwards was only compatible with a select few games.

Nintendo DS 

Much like the Wii, the Nintendo DS has built-in wireless capabilities and is similarly not compatible with all wireless routers. Another hindrance is that the DS does not support certain levels of wi-fi encryption (e.g. WPA), thus necessitating the Nintendo Wi-Fi USB Connector.

References 

Wireless networking